Governments and private organizations have developed car classification schemes that are used for various purposes including regulation, description, and categorization of cars.

The International Standard ISO 3833-1977 Road vehicles – Types – Terms and definitions also defines terms for classifying cars.

Summary of classifications 
The following table summarises the commonly used terms of market segments and legal classifications.

Market segments

Microcar / kei car 

Microcars and their Japanese equivalent— kei cars— are the smallest category of automobile.

Microcars straddle the boundary between car and motorbike, and are often covered by separate regulations to normal cars, resulting in relaxed requirements for registration and licensing. Engine size is often  or less, and microcars have three or four wheels.

Microcars are most popular in Europe, where they originated following World War II. The predecessors to micro cars are voiturettes and cycle cars. Kei cars have been used in Japan since 1949.

Examples of microcars and kei cars:

 Honda Life
 Smart ForTwo
 Tata Nano

A-segment / City car / Minicompact  

The smallest category of vehicles that are registered as normal cars is called A-segment in Europe, or "city car" in Europe and the United States. The United States Environmental Protection Agency defines this category as "minicompact." However, this term is not widely used.

The equivalents of A-segment cars have been produced since the early 1920s. However, the category increased in popularity in the late 1950s when the original Fiat 500 and BMC Mini were released.

Examples of A-segment / city cars / minicompact cars:
 Fiat 500
 Hyundai i10
 Toyota Aygo

B-segment / Supermini / Subcompact 

The next larger category small cars is called B-segment Europe, supermini in the United Kingdom and subcompact in the United States.

Since the EPA's smaller minicompact category is not as commonly used by the general public, A-segment cars are sometimes called subcompacts in the United States. In Europe and Great Britain, the B-segment and supermini categories do not have any formal definitions based on size.

Early supermini cars in Great Britain include the 1977 Ford Fiesta and Vauxhall Chevette.

In the United States, the first locally-built subcompact cars were the 1970 AMC Gremlin, Chevrolet Vega, and Ford Pinto.

Examples of B-segment / supermini / subcompact cars:
 Chevrolet Aveo (Chevrolet Sonic)
 Hyundai Accent
 Volkswagen Polo

C-segment / Small family / Compact 

The largest category of small cars is called C-segment or small family car in Europe, and compact car in the United States.

Examples of C-segment / compact / small family cars:
 Honda Civic
 Toyota Corolla
 Renault Mégane

D-segment / Large family / Mid-size 

In Europe, the third-largest category for passenger cars is called D-segment or large family car.

In the United States, the equivalent term is mid-size or intermediate cars.

Examples of D-segment / large family / mid-size cars:
 Chevrolet Malibu
 Ford Mondeo
 Kia K5

E-segment / Executive / Full-size 

In Europe, the second-largest category for passenger cars is E-segment / executive car, which are usually luxury cars.

In other countries, the equivalent terms are full-size car or large car, which are also used for relatively affordable large cars that are not considered luxury cars.

Examples of non-luxury full-size cars:
 Chevrolet Impala
 Toyota Avalon

F-segment / Luxury saloon / Full-size luxury 
See Luxury saloon / full-size luxury section below.

Minivans / MPVs 
Minivan is an American car classification for vehicles that are designed to transport passengers in the rear seating rows, have reconfigurable seats in two or three rows. The equivalent terms in British English are multi-purpose vehicle (MPV), people carrier, and people mover. Minivans are often of the "one-box" or "two-box" body configuration, high roofs, flat floors, sliding doors for rear passengers, and high H-point seating.

Mini MPV 

Mini MPV is the smallest size of MPVs and the vehicles are often built on the platforms of B-segment hatchback models.

Examples of Mini MPVs:
 Fiat 500L
 Honda Freed
 Ford B-Max

Compact MPV 

Compact MPV is the middle size of MPVs. The compact MPV size class sits between the mini MPV and large MPV (minivan) size classes.

Compact MPVs remain predominantly a European phenomenon, although they are also built and sold in many Latin American and Asian markets.

Examples of Compact MPVs:
 Renault Scénic
 Volkswagen Touran
 Ford C-Max

Large MPV 

The largest size of minivans is also referred to as "large MPV" and became popular following the introduction of the 1984 Renault Espace and Dodge Caravan. Since the 1990s, the smaller compact MPV and mini MPV sizes of minivans have also become popular. If the term "minivan" is used without specifying a size, it usually refers to a large MPV.

Examples of Large MPVs:
 Chrysler Pacifica
 Ford S-Max
 Toyota Sienna

Luxury vehicles

Premium compact 

The premium compact class (also called subcompact executive) is the smallest category of luxury cars. It became popular in the mid-2000s, when European manufacturers — such as Audi, BMW, and Mercedes-Benz — introduced new entry-level models that were smaller and cheaper than their compact executive models.

Examples of premium compact cars:
 Acura ILX
 Mercedes-Benz CLA-Class
 Lexus CT200h

Compact executive / luxury compact 

A compact executive car or a compact luxury car is a premium car larger than a premium compact and smaller than an executive car. Compact executive cars are equivalent size to mid-size cars and are part of the D-segment in the European car classification.

In North American terms, close equivalents are "luxury compact" and "entry-level luxury car", although the latter is also used for the smaller premium compact cars.

Examples of compact executive cars:
 Audi A4
 BMW 3 Series
 Volvo S60

Executive / mid-size luxury  

An executive car is a premium car larger than a compact executive and smaller than a full-size luxury car. Executive cars are classified as E-segment cars in the European car classification.

In the United States and several other countries, the equivalent categories are full-size car (not to be confused with the European category of "full-size luxury car") or mid-size luxury car.

Examples of executive cars:
 Mercedes-Benz E-Class
 Lexus GS
 Volvo S90

Luxury saloon / full-size luxury 

The largest size of a luxury car is known as a luxury saloon in the United Kingdom and a full-size luxury car in the United States. These cars are classified as F-segment cars in the European car classification.

Vehicles in this category are often the flagship models of luxury car brands.

Examples of luxury saloons:
 BMW 7 Series
 Lincoln Continental
 Porsche Panamera

Sports / performance cars 
Cars that prioritize handling or straight-line acceleration are called sports cars or performance cars. However the term "sports car" is also sometimes used specifically for lightweight two-seat cars. Sports/performance cars can either be built on unique platforms or be upgraded versions of regular cars.

Common categories of sports/performance cars are:

sports car
sports sedan / sports saloon
supercar
hypercar
hot hatch
sport compact
muscle car
pony car
grand tourer

The definitions for these categories are often blurred and a car may be a member of multiple categories.

Sports car 

Sports cars are designed to emphasize handling, performance, or the thrill of driving. Sports cars originated in Europe in the early 1900s, with one of the first recorded usages of the term "sports car" being in The Times newspaper in the United Kingdom in 1919. Sports cars started to become popular during the 1920s. The term was originally used for two-seat roadsters (cars without fixed roofs). However, since the 1970s the term has also been used for cars with fixed roofs (which were previously considered grand tourers).

Examples of sports cars:
 Chevrolet Corvette
 Mazda MX-5
 Porsche 911

Sports sedan / sports saloon 

A sports sedan — also known as "sports saloon" — is a subjective term for a sedan/saloon car which is designed to have sporting performance or handling characteristics.

Examples of sports sedans:
 BMW M5
 Mazdaspeed6 / Mazda 6 MPS
 Dodge Charger

Supercar / hypercar 

A supercar – also called an exotic car – is a loosely-defined description of certain high-performance sportscars. Since the 1990s or 2000s, the term "hypercar" has come into use for the highest performing supercars.

Examples of supercars:
 McLaren P1
 Koenigsegg Agera R
 Bugatti Veyron 16.4

SUVs / off-road vehicles 
Passenger vehicles with off-road capability or styling features are often categorized as either off-road vehicles, sports utility vehicles, or crossover SUVs. There are no commonly agreed boundaries between these categories, and usage of the terms varies between countries.

Off-road vehicle 

The earliest type of passenger vehicle is called an "off-roader", "four-by-four" or "four-wheel drive". Off-road vehicles usually more focussed on off-road capability than SUVs and crossover SUVs (often compromising their on-road ride quality or handling). Common features of off-road vehicles are four-wheel drive, high ground clearance, a body-on-frame (separate chassis) construction and low-range gearing.

Examples of off-road vehicles:
 Nissan Patrol
 Toyota Land Cruiser
 Suzuki Jimny

Sport utility vehicle 

A sports utility vehicle (SUV) combines elements of road-going passenger cars with features from off-road vehicles, such as raised ground clearance and four-wheel drive.

There is no commonly agreed definition of an SUV, and usage varies between countries. Some definitions claim that an SUV must be built on a light-truck chassis. However, a broader definition considers any vehicle with off-road design features as an SUV. In some countries — such as the United States — SUVs have been classified as "light trucks", resulting in more lenient regulations compared to passenger cars.

The predecessors to SUVs date back to military and low-volume models from the late 1930s, and the four-wheel drive station wagons / carryalls that began to be introduced in 1949. The 1984 Jeep Cherokee (XJ) is considered to be the first SUV in the modern style. Most SUVs produced today use unibody construction (as per passenger cars). However, in the past, many SUVs used body-on-frame construction.

Examples of SUVs:
 Chevrolet Tahoe
 Mercedes-Benz M-Class
 Mitsubishi Pajero

Crossover SUV 

A crossover SUV— also called crossover or CUV— is a type of sports utility vehicle (SUV) that uses a unibody construction. Crossovers are often based on a platform shared with a passenger car, as a result, they typically have better comfort and fuel economy, but less off-road capability (many crossovers are sold without all-wheel drive) than truck-based SUVs, though more so than passenger cars.

There are various inconsistencies about whether vehicles are considered crossovers or SUVs, therefore the term SUV is often used as a catch-all for both crossovers and SUVs.

Examples of crossover SUVs:
 Nissan Qashqai
 Tesla Model Y
Volkswagen Tiguan

Government classification methods 

These classifications can be based on body style (e.g. sedan, coupe or hatchback), number of doors or seating capacity.

Government departments often create classification schemes for the purposes of taxation or regulating vehicle usage (e.g. vehicles that require a specific licence or are restricted to certain roads). Some jurisdictions may determine vehicle tax based upon environmental principles, such as the user pays principle.

Australia 
In Australia, the Federal Chamber of Automotive Industries publishes its own classifications.

Canada 
A similar set of classes is used by the Canadian EPA. The Canadian National Collision Database (NCDB) system defines "passenger car" as a unique class, but also identifies two other categories involving passenger vehicles—the "passenger van" and "light utility vehicle"—and these categories are inconsistently handled across the country with the boundaries between the vehicles increasingly blurred.

United Kingdom 
In the United Kingdom, a vehicle is taxed according to the vehicle's construction, engine, weight, type of fuel and emissions, as well as the purpose for which it is used.

United States 
In the United States, since 2010 the Insurance Institute for Highway Safety uses a scheme it has developed that takes into account a combination of both vehicle footprint (length times width) and weight.

The United States National Highway Traffic Safety Administration (NHTSA) separates vehicles into classes by the curb weight of the vehicle with standard equipment including the maximum capacity of fuel, oil, coolant, and air conditioning, if so equipped.

The United States Federal Highway Administration has developed a classification scheme used for automatically calculating road use tolls. There are two broad categories depending on whether the vehicle carries passengers or commodities. Vehicles that carry commodities are further subdivided by number of axles and number of units, including both power and trailer units.

The United States Environmental Protection Agency (US EPA) has developed a classification scheme used to compare fuel economy among similar vehicles. Passenger vehicles are classified based on a vehicle's total interior passenger and cargo volumes. Trucks are classified based upon their gross vehicle weight rating (GVWR). Heavy-duty vehicles are not included within the EPA scheme.

Certain cities in the United States in the 1920s chose to exempt electric-powered vehicles because officials believed those vehicles did not cause "substantial wear upon the pavements".

North American market segments 
Several other segment descriptions, listed below, are used in North America. Cars from these segments may also be sold in other countries. However, usage of the terms is mostly specific to within North America.

Muscle car 

Muscle car is an American term for high-performance cars, usually rear-wheel drive and fitted with a large and powerful V8 engine. The term originated for the 1960s and early 1970s special editions of mass-production cars which were designed for drag racing.

Examples of muscle cars:
 Ford Torino
 Plymouth Road Runner
 Pontiac GTO

Pony car 

Pony car is an American class of automobile launched and inspired by the Ford Mustang in 1964. It broke all post-World War II automobile sales records, "creating the 'pony car' craze soon adopted by competitors." The term describes an affordable, compact, highly styled car with a sporty or performance-oriented image

Examples of pony cars:
 AMC Javelin
 Chevrolet Camaro
 Dodge Challenger

Personal luxury car 

A personal luxury car is a North American market segment for premium coupé or convertible produced from 1952–2007. These two door cars prioritized comfort, styling and a high level of interior features. Not prioritizing maximum interior space, interior volumes are equivalent size to mid-size cars and are part of the D-segment in the European car classification, and exterior dimensions can exceed F-segment.

The segment rose to popularity following the success of the 1958-60 Ford Thunderbird, which sold 200,000 units. Personal luxury cars from General Motors and Chrysler respectively include the Buick Riviera and Chrysler Cordoba.

Examples of personal luxury cars:
 Ford Thunderbird
 Cadillac Eldorado
 Chrysler Cordoba

Sport compact 

A sporting version of an affordable compact car or a subcompact car. There is no precise definition and the description is applied for marketing purposes to a wide variety of models.

Cars began to be marketed as sport compacts in the mid-1980s when it was used for option packages on American-built coupes. Since then, it has also been used for standalone sports car models and cars imported from Europe and Asia.

The European equivalent is a hot hatch. However, sport compacts are not restricted to just hatchback body styles.

Examples of sport compact cars:
 Chevrolet Cavalier Z24
 Ford Probe
 Honda Civic Si

European market segments 
Several other segment descriptions, listed below, are used in Europe. Cars from these segments may also be sold in other countries. However, usage of the terms is mostly specific to within Europe.

Grand tourer 

A grand tourer (GT) is a car that is designed for high speed and long-distance driving, due to a combination of performance and luxury attributes. The most common format is a front-engine, rear-wheel-drive two-door coupé with either a two-seat or a 2+2 arrangement.

The term derives from the Italian language phrase gran turismo which became popular in the English language from the 1950s, evolving from fast touring cars and streamlined closed sports cars during the 1930s.

Examples of grand tourers:
 Aston Martin V8
 Lexus SC300/400
 Ferrari 612 Scaglietti

Hot hatch 

Hot hatch (shortened from hot hatchback) is a high-performance version of a mass-produced hatchback car.

The term originated in the mid-1980s. However, factory high-performance versions of hatchbacks have been produced since the 1970s.

Front-mounted petrol engines, together with front-wheel drive, is the most common powertrain layout. However, all-wheel drive has become more commonly used since around 2010. Most hot hatches are manufactured in Europe or Asia.

Examples of hot hatches:
 Volkswagen Golf GTi
 Peugeot 205 GTi
 Honda Civic Type R

See also 

 ACRISS Car Classification Code
 Car body style
 Commercial vehicle
 Three-wheeler
 Truck classification
 Vehicle category
 Vehicle size class

References 

 
classifications